Lucie Hradecká and Ekaterina Makarova were the defending champions, but Makarova could not participate this year due to injury. Hradecká played alongside Andreja Klepač and successfully defended her title, defeating Anna-Lena Grönefeld and Demi Schuurs in the final, 6–4, 6–1.

Seeds
The top four seeds received a bye into the second round.

Draw

Finals

Top half

Bottom half

References

External links
 Main draw

Women's Doubles